Serafim Urechean (born 2 February 1950) is a Moldovan politician. He held the position of general mayor of Chișinău municipality (1994–2005) and interim prime minister of the Republic of Moldova (5 – 17 February 1999). He was the chairman of the party Our Moldova Alliance (2003–2011), first deputy chairman of the Parliament of the Republic of Moldova (2009–2010) and president of the Court of Accounts of the Republic of Moldova (2011–2016).

Biography 
Urechean was born on February 2, 1950, at Larga, Briceni, in the Moldovan SSR,   in a peasant's family.

Education and career 
After graduation of the Middle School in his native village, he continued his education at the Polytechnic Institute in Chișinău, at the Faculty of Civil and Industrial Engineering (1969–1974), which he graduated from in 1974, obtaining the qualification of construction engineer. He was a member of the Communist Party of the Soviet Union.

In the same year, the compulsory military service began in the Soviet army, during which, for two years, he participated, directly, in the construction of the famous car plant in Tolyatti, Russia (1974–1976).

After demobilization, in 1976, he continued his professional activity in the native district – Briceni as an engineer within the Constructions Enterprise Briceni (1976–1978). In this capacity, he works on the construction sites of the Briceni district. He led construction works on several social-economic sites.

In 1978 he was co-opted within the political structures of Briceni district. He held the position of Head of Department for Industrial and Constructions Development, Second Secretary of the District Committee of the Communist Party of Moldova in Briceni (1978–1983).

In 1983–1985, he studied at the  Higher Party School of Leningrad, Russia. Returning to the Republic of Moldova, he worked at the Central Committee of the Communist Party of Moldova. He holds, for a short time, the position of inspector and, in the same year, he was transferred as the second secretary at the district committee  Anenii Noi of the CPM. In November 1985 he was elected as Chairman of the District Executive Committee of the  Anenii Noi by the People's Deputies (1985–1987).

He then worked for the Federation of Independent Trade Unions of the Republic of Moldova (1987–1994), first as vice president, then as first vice president and finally as president. In parallel, for a period, he was an MP at the Parliament of the Republic of Moldova (1991–1994). In parallel, for a period, he was an MP at the Parliament of the Republic of Moldova (1991–1994). He led the faction of independent MPs.

On August 9, 1994, by decree of the President of the Republic of Moldova, he was appointed as General Mayor of Chișinău Municipality. He was re-elected successively as mayor in the 1999 and 2003. He holds the position of mayor of Chișinău between 1994 and 2005. Since May 23, 1999, the position was called differently as a general mayor.

He is a titular member of the Congress of Local and Regional Powers of the Council of Europe, president of the Federation of Local and Regional Powers of the Republic of Moldova (since 1996). He was president of the Chess Federation of the Republic of Moldova between 1995 and 2005. The president of the Moldavian branch of the International Academy of Engineering.

As mayor of Chișinău municipality he directly supported and contributed to the organization of several international forums and conferences in Chișinău under the auspice of UN, UNESCO, NATO, TACIS, etc. He is also co-author of the monograph on Scientific and Technological Achievements Related to the Development of European Cities, NATO. ASI Series. Vol. 9.

On February 5 and 17, 1999, he held the position of interim prime minister of the Republic of Moldova. President Petru Lucinschi delegated him as a candidate for the position of prime minister, but he did not get the support of the parliament, he withdrew his candidacy.

On December 21, 1999, by the Decree no. 1263 (art. 3) of the President of the Republic of Moldova, Petru Lucinschi, was declared that Serafim Urechean, in his capacity as general mayor of Chișinău municipality, would become a member of the ex officio Government. He held the position of member of the government by the time of adoption of the Law no. 806-XV of February 5, 2002, for amending and completing the Statute of Chișinău municipality, when he was suspended of being a member of the Government of the Republic of Moldova.

Serafim Urechean was very proactive in the political life. In 2001 he became the President of the Social-Political Movement Independents' Alliance of Moldova, in 2003 he became the co-president of the Party Our Moldova Alliance (in 2005 – 2011 he became the president), and in 2004 – 2005 he was the leader of the Electoral Bloc Democratic Moldova.

At the parliamentary elections of March 6, 2005, Electoral Bloc Democratic Moldova, led by the Chișinău mayor Serafim Urechean, accumulated 28.53% of the votes of the participants and got 34 mandates out of 101. In accordance with article 70 of the Constitution of Moldova, "the MP position is not compliant with the any other remunerated function, except the didactic and scientific activity". On April 18, 2005, in the last day of the one-month term given for the validation of the mandate, provided to decide whether to accept or reject the position for which was elected, Serafim Urechean decided to resign as mayor of Chișinău in favour of the deputy in the Parliament of the Republic Moldova.

On April 21, 2011, he was appointed for the position of the chairman of the Court of Accounts of the Republic of Moldova.

At the local elections in Chișinău held in 2015, Serafim Urechean was a candidate for the position of mayor from the part of the Liberal Democratic Party of Moldova. However, when he appeared on the talk shows during the election campaign, Urechean has stated: "I am not a member of any party, nor of the LDPM. By definition I cannot be, because I am going to chair an apolitical structure. If I become a mayor, I will remain apolitical. I am not going to join any party; I will be mayor of all the citizens of the Chișinău." During two months of election campaign he resigned from the position of the chairman of the Court of Accounts. Following the elections on June 14, 2015, Serafim Urechean has got only 2.97% of the vote.

Alliance For European Integration

After the July 2009 parliamentary election, alongside Vlad Filat, Mihai Ghimpu, and Marian Lupu, Serafim Urechean signed the Alliance For European Integration in a press conference on August 8, 2009.

Personal life 
He is married to Tatiana Marcenco and has two children.

Distinctions 
He is decorated with the Order of the Republic of Moldova (2000), [4] the Order "Shield of Honor", the Order "For the development of science and education", the Orders "Saint Dumitru" of the second grade, "Sergii Radonezhsky" and "Saint Stanislav", granted by the Russian Orthodox Church by the Russian Patriarch, Patriarch Alexy II.

In April 2015 he was awarded the honorary title of "Emeritus".

External links 
 Alianţa Moldova Noastră
 Serafim URECHEAN

References

1950 births
Living people
People from Briceni District
Prime Ministers of Moldova
Mayors of Chișinău
Deputy Presidents of the Moldovan Parliament
Members of the parliament of Moldova
Our Moldova Alliance politicians
Electoral Bloc Democratic Moldova politicians
Communist Party of Moldavia politicians
Moldovan MPs 1990–1994
Moldovan MPs 2005–2009
Moldovan MPs 2009
Moldovan MPs 2009–2010
Moldovan engineers
Recipients of the Order of the Republic (Moldova)
Independents' Alliance of Moldova politicians
Recipients of the Order of Honour (Moldova)